Cable Union Airport,  is a city owned public use airport located 2 miles (3 km) southeast of the central business district of Cable, Wisconsin, a town in Bayfield County, Wisconsin, United States. It is included in the Federal Aviation Administration (FAA) National Plan of Integrated Airport Systems for 2021–2025, in which it is categorized as a general aviation facility.

Although most airports in the United States use the same three-letter location identifier for the FAA and International Air Transport Association (IATA), this airport is assigned 3CU by the FAA but has no designation from the IATA.

Facilities and aircraft 
Cable Union Airport covers an area of 218 acres (88 ha) at an elevation of 1,360 feet (415 m) above mean sea level. It has two runways: 17/35 is 3,709 by 75 feet (1,131 x 23 m) with an asphalt surface and 8/26 is 2,194 by 150 feet (669 x 46 m) with a  turf surface.

For the 12-month period ending July 29, 2021, the airport had 5,510 aircraft operations, an average of 15 per day: 90% general aviation, 10% air taxi and less than 1% military.
In January 2023, there were 9 aircraft based at this airport: 7 single-engine and 2 multi-engine.

See also
List of airports in Wisconsin

References

External links 
Cable at Wisconsin DOT Airport Directory
 

Airports in Wisconsin
Buildings and structures in Bayfield County, Wisconsin